The 2016–17 FA Vase Final was the 43rd final of the Football Association's cup competition for teams at levels 9–11 of the English football league system. The match was contested between Cleethorpes Town and South Shields. This was first time both teams had reached the final and their first visit to Wembley Stadium. The final of the FA Trophy was played on the same day at the same venue for the second year running. Both matches were televised in the UK on BT Sport.

Cleethorpes Town defeated AFC Emley, Bootle, Billingham Town, Atherton Collieries, Southall and Bromsgrove Sporting en route to the final.

South Shields defeated Esh Winning, Runcorn Linnets, Marske United, Staveley Miners Welfare, last season's champions Morpeth Town, Team Solent, Newport Pagnell Town and Coleshill Town en route to the final.

This match is notable in the history of English football, as it was the first time an openly gay male footballer had taken to the pitch at Wembley, with Cleethorpes Town player Liam Davis having come out two years prior.

Route to the final

Cleethorpes Town

South Shields

* – Match abandoned after floodlight failure in the 81st minute (2–4) – rematch moved to Morpeth Town

Match

Details

References

2017
FA Vase Final
FA Vase Final 2017
FA Vase Final